Namatakula is a village located in Fiji on the Coral Coast. The population is approximately 2,522.

Notable people
Namatakula is famous for producing rugby league and rugby union stars.

Dual code
Lote Tuqiri dual international
Noa Nadruku - Canberra Raiders player

Rugby union
Tevita Kuridrani Wallaby and ACT Brumbies and his cousins
Nemani Nadolo - Canterbury Crusaders , cousin of Tevita
Chris Kuridrani - Queensland Reds, cousin of Tevita

Before them, Isei Nasiganiyavi the father of Nemani and Chris played for the Reds in the 80s while Luke Erenavula played for the North Sydney Bears at around the same time as Noa Nadruku for the Canberra Raiders before moving across the Tasman to play for Counties Manukau and the New Zealand 7s team. Aisea Batibasaga and Elia Tuqiri from Namatakula also played for the Wallabies 7s team while another cousin Lote Tuqiri played for Japan.
Josh Tuqiri, nephew of Lote Tuqiri also hails from Namatakula. Josh is well known for his contributions in the GPS and Souths Rugby clubs.

External links
 Fiji Google Satellite map

Populated places in Fiji
Nadroga-Navosa Province